Raccordo autostradale 8 (RA 8) is a motorway managed by ANAS, which connects the Autostrada A13 to the Adriatic Sea in the municipality of Comacchio, near Porto Garibaldi.

References 

RA09
Transport in Emilia-Romagna